The 1999–2000 Japan Figure Skating Championships were the 68th edition of the event. They were held on December 24–26, 1999 in Fukuoka. National Champions were crowned in the disciplines of men's singles, ladies' singles, pair skating, and ice dancing. As well as crowning the national champions of Japan for the 1999–2000 season, the results of this competition were used to help pick the teams for the 2000 World Championships and the 2000 Four Continents Championships.

Results

Men

Ladies

Pairs

Ice dancing

External links
 1999–2000 Japan Figure Skating Championships results

Japan Figure Skating Championships
1999 in figure skating
2000 in figure skating
1999 in Japanese sport